Gailey railway station was a railway station built by the Grand Junction Railway in 1837. It served the small village of  Gailey, Staffordshire, 7 miles north of Wolverhampton City Centre, and was located near to the junction of the A5 and A449 roads.

The original name of the station was Spread Eagle railway station, and was named after a nearby pub.  It was renamed Gailey in 1881.

The station closed in 1951, although the Rugby-Birmingham-Stafford Line loop from the West Coast Main Line still runs through the site of the station today.

References

Staffordshire Past Track: Gailey Railway Station image
Railway Stations and Pub Names
British History: Penkridge

Disused railway stations in Staffordshire
Former London and North Western Railway stations
Railway stations in Great Britain opened in 1837
Railway stations in Great Britain closed in 1951